The cyclogyro, or cyclocopter, is an aircraft configuration that uses a horizontal-axis cyclorotor as a rotor wing to provide lift and sometimes also propulsion and control. In principle, the cyclogyro is capable of vertical take off and landing and hovering performance like a helicopter, while potentially benefiting from some of the advantages of a fixed-wing aircraft.

The cyclogyro is distinct from the Flettner airplane which uses a cylindrical wing rotor to harness the Magnus effect.

Principles of operation
The cyclogyro wing resembles a paddle wheel, with airfoil blades replacing the paddles. Like a helicopter, the blade pitch (angle of attack) can be adjusted either collectively all together or cyclically as they move around the rotor's axis. In normal forward flight the blades are given a slight positive pitch at the upper and forward portions of their arc producing lift and, if powered, also forward thrust. They are given flat or negative pitch at the bottom, and are "flat" through the rest of the circle to produce little or no lift in other directions. Blade pitch can be adjusted to change the thrust profile, allowing the cyclogyro to travel in any direction without the need for separate control surfaces. Differential thrust between the two wings (one on either side of the fuselage) can be used to turn the aircraft around its vertical axis, although conventional tail surfaces may be used as well.

History

Jonathan Edward Caldwell took out a patent on the cyclogyro which was granted in 1927, but he never followed it up.

The Schroeder S1 of 1930 was a full-size prototype which used the cyclogyro for forward thrust only. Adolf Rohrbach of Germany designed a full VTOL version in 1933, which was later developed in the US and featured a tall streamlined fuselage to keep the wings clear of the ground. Another example was built by Rahn Aircraft in 1935, which used two large-chord rotary wings instead of a multi-blade wheel driven by a 240 hp supercharged Wright Whirlwind

The cyclogyro has been revisited in the twenty-first century, as a possible configuration for unmanned aerial vehicles.

See also
 FanWing
 Rotary-wing aircraft
 VTOL/STOL/VSTOL/STOVL

References

Further reading
 "The Cyclogyro", Vertiflight, The American Helicopter Society, 2005, Vol. 51; No. 2, pages 16–19

External links
 

Rotorcraft